Pangyo (판교, 板橋) refers to a planned city in South Korea, surrounding Pangyo-dong, Baekhyeon-dong, Unjung-dong, and Sampyeong-dong of Bundang-gu and Siheung-dong and Sasong-dong of Sujeong-gu (Seongnam city).

The area is surrounded by the mountains Cheonggyesan and Geumtosan to the North and Barasan to the south, with Unjungcheon and Geumtocheon, tributaries of Tancheon, flowing through the center of the city.

This area is 9,307,000 m2 (2,815,000 pyeong) and can hold up to 80,412 people with 29,350 families.

Gyeongbu Expressway separates the town into two unofficial regions: Seopangyo (literally, West Pangyo) and Dongpangyo (literally, East Pangyo).

Origin
The origin of the name of Pangyo (Board Footbridge) was 'Neodeori' or 'Neoldari', meaning a footbridge made of planks of wood over the Unjungcheon (Cloud Staying Brook) originating from the west and running toward the east in the front of Pangyo, written in Chinese characters. According to Sinjeung Dongguk Yeoji Seungnam (a survey of Korean geography published in the Joseon Dynasty) in 1530, Pangyo-won, Yeokwon-gun, Gwangju-mok are recorded to be 45 ri away to the south of the state. Therefore, it can be assumed that the use of the place name Pangyo traces back to the early Joseon Dynasty.

It has been said that the place name of Naksaeng (Pleasant Life) from Naksaeng-myun has its origins in either Nakseong from the Nakseong Market or Nakseong (Defeated Castle) in that the king surrendered hearing the news of Sea-gyu Jeong, a soldier in Chungju, who was marching north to protect Namhansanseong Fortress but defeated at Pangyo. However, in the description of Gwangju-mok in Sinjeung Dongguk Yeoji Seungnam, there is a comment of the governor of Gwangju-mok Hwa-boo Paek, who arrived at the Naksaeng station on the way of going home in April, 1349 in the travel account by Gok Yi during the reign of King Chungjeong. Therefore, the place name Naksaeng should have been originated from the Goryeo Dynasty.

Background
Pangyo was approved for development in 2001 to alleviate the excessive demand for apartments in Gangnam and central Bundang.  The town was developed into an eco-friendly city with the lowest population density among newly developed cities. Pangyo was designed with large green spaces and parks along its streams. Waste facilities, energy plants, and sewage treatment facilities in the community were built to maximize energy efficiency with the use of green technology.

Pangyo was issued by real estate speculation and apart application in the beginning. Also, it carried over that government of Seongnam city declared moratorium for the first time.

World class medical centers with the latest technologies such as Seoul National University Hospital, Samsung Medical Center, and Hyundai Asan Medical Center are located near Pangyo.

Construction of the town began in December 2003, and phase 1 and phase 2 were completed in December 2009 and December 2010, respectively. However, construction projects such as Pangyo Techno Valley and the Alpha Dome city are still in progress.

Transportation
Gyeongbu Expressway, Seoul Ring Expressway, and Yongin-Seoul Expressway pass through Pangyo. These three expressways are accessible through Pangyo IC (Gyeongbu Expressway) and Seopangyo IC (Yongin-Seoul Expressway), and Gyeongbu Expressway and Seoul Ring Expressway intersect at Pangyo JCT, located nearby. Bundang-Naegok City Expressway and Bundang-Suseo City Expressway, which connect the suburbs Bundang and Yongin to Southern Seoul, pass through Dongpangyo.

Pangyo Station of Shinbundang Line opened service to public on October 28, 2011. This subway line enables travel to Gangnam within 15 minutes. In 2016, Pangyo became the terminal station for Gyeonggang Line. The Seongnam-Yeoju Line is one of the three sections of the main-line railway that is to connect the cities of Seongnam and Mungyeong upon its expected completion in 2016.

Education
Since Pangyo lies under the jurisdiction of Seongnam city, the High School Equalization Policy, (고교평준화제도), takes in place.

Korea International School and Seongnam Foreign Language High school (성남외국어고등학교) are also located in Baekhyeon-dong, part of Pangyo.

Pangyo has 19 schools, including: 8 primary schools, 6 middle schools, and 6 high schools.

Pangyo also has a library, located in Pangyo-dong 533.

Economy 
Pangyo Techno Valley, Academy of Korean Studies, Korea Food Research Institute, Korea Petroleum Management Institute, and Daehan Oil Pipeline Corporation are located in Pangyo. In the Techno Valley, IT companies such as NHN, Nexon, Ahnlab and SK Planet have their headquarters, while many others such as Kakao have office presences.

Culture

Pangyo Museum
The Pangyo Museum opened April, 2013, featuring various monuments related to the creation of Pangyo.

Avenue France
Avenue France is a shopping plaza in Pangyo known for its cafes and restaurants.

La Street 
La Street is a shopping plaza in Pangyo which is next to Pangyo Station.

Pangyo Hyundai Department Store
The Hyundai Department Store Pangyo location is the largest luxury department store in the Seoul Capital Area, which opened on 21 August 2015. This department store features the largest food court in Korea.

See also
Pangyo Techno Valley

References

External links

Official Website by Ministry of Construction and Transportation

Bundang
New towns in South Korea
New towns started in the 2000s